Family Court with Judge Penny is an American arbitration-based reality court show, presided over by former judge and lawyer Penny Brown Reynolds. The half-hour program, which aired in Syndication, premiered on September 23, 2008. It was produced by 44 Blue Productions and distributed by Program Partners in the United States and Canada. Sony handled barter advertising. The show was nominated for a Daytime Emmy in 2009, but was never renewed and ended production that same year.

The show was in its first taping when the 5.4 Chino Hills earthquake occurred on July 29, 2008. Everyone remained calm and everyone including Judge Penny took cover under the nearest furniture. No injuries occurred. In interviews with Showbiz Tonight and Access Hollywood the following day Reynolds says that this was the first time that she experienced an earthquake, then joked about it by saying she was ready to "Shake up" courtroom TV shows.

About the life of Judge Penny Brown Reynolds 

Judge Penny Brown Reynolds an Emmy-nominated national television personality and commentator on issues of law, politics and religion, and on women and children's issues.

Reynolds served as a state trial court judge in Atlanta, Georgia for nearly a decade. Before her appointment to the bench in 2000, she served as Executive Counsel to Georgia's Governor, where she was the first African American to hold such a position. Ebony and Jet magazines recognized her for this accomplishment. She is a former prosecutor and Assistant Attorney General.

Reynolds' history in television began with a 2007 appearance on Dr. Phil. Appearances as a commentator on Fox News followed. While in seminary school, she was soon approached by 44 Blue Productions to host her own daily, half-hour, internationally syndicated television show, Family Court with Judge Penny. After graduation, she accepted the offer. She lectures at numerous colleges and universities, conferences and conventions. She assists corporations with diversity issues and crisis management. She also serves as an ordained minister.

Reynolds is the author of several published articles, and a book, 7 Steps to Peace of Mind. She is the author and co-editor of Women and the Law: A Guide to Women's Legal Rights in Georgia.

Reynolds earned a B.S. cum laude, from Georgia State University after three years of study, a J.D. from Georgia State University College of Law and a master's degree from the Interdenominational Theological Center, graduating first in her class with highest honors.

She has founded a 501(c) (3) non-profit corporation, the Judge Penny Brown Reynolds Foundation Inc., for the purpose of restoring families and empowering women and young people. She is a veteran social activist and is president and CEO of Divine Destiny Productions, LLC.

Reynolds and her husband, Rev. Edward S. Reynolds are the parents of two grown sons and a granddaughter.

References

External links
 

2000s American reality television series
2008 American television series debuts
2009 American television series endings
Court shows
English-language television shows
First-run syndicated television programs in the United States
Television series by Sony Pictures Television